Koluvere is a village in Lääne-Nigula Parish, Lääne County in western Estonia.

Koluvere castle is located in Koluvere.

See also
Battle of Lode

References

Villages in Lääne County
Kreis Wiek